The 2013–14 season was the Manitoba Junior Hockey League's (MJHL) 97th season of operation.

The Selkirk Steelers posted the best record in the regular season with 49 win and 102 points.  The Steelers, however, could not advance past the first round, as they were defeated by the Winnipeg Blues, the eventual Turnbull Cup champions.  This was the Blues' 17th MJHL championship in franchise history.  

The Winnipeg Blues and Dauphin Kings both participated in the 2014 Western Canada Cup in Dauphin.  The Kings advanced as far as the 2014 Royal Bank Cup semi-finals before being eliminated.

Season highlights  
The league changes its playoff structure, adding a best-of-three "survivor series" where the fourth and fifth place teams compete for the final playoff berth in each division.
This is the last year of divisional play in the MJHL.  The league moves to a one-division format next year.

Standings

Playoffs

Most MJHL playoffs
Western Canada Cup
Dauphin hosts the 2014 Western Canada Cup
Dauphin Kings finish first in round robin; defeated by Yorkton Terriers 5-4 in championship game; defeat Spruce Grove Saints 4-3 in runner-up game to claim the second Western seed for the Royal Bank Cup.
Winnipeg Blues finish fifth in round robin and eliminated from playoffs.
Royal Bank Cup
Kings finish first in round robin; defeated 6-3 by Vernon Vipers in semi-final.

League awards 
 Steve "Boomer" Hawrysh Award (MVP): Parker Thomas, Selkirk
 MJHL Top Goaltender Award: Braeden Ostepchuk, Selkirk
 Brian Kozak Award (Top Defenceman): Joel Messner, Selkirk
 Vince Leah Trophy (Rookie of the Year): Tyler Jeanson, Portage
 Lorne Lyndon Memorial Trophy (Hockey Ability and Sportsmanship): Max Flanagan, Swan Valley
 Muzz McPherson Award (Coach of the Year): Ryan Smith, Selkirk
 Mike Ridley Trophy (Scoring Champion): Parker Thomas, Selkirk
 MJHL Playoff MVP: Byron Spriggs, Winnipeg

CJHL awards 
 CJHL Player of the Year (MJHL): Braeden Ostepchuk, Selkirk

References

External links
 MJHL Website
 2013-14 MJHL season at HockeyDB.com

Manitoba Junior Hockey League seasons
MJHL